Fidel Solórzano (born May 26, 1962) is a retired male athlete from Ecuador, who competed in the long jump event and the decathlon during his career.

Career
He represented his native country twice at the Summer Olympics: 1984 and 1988.

Achievements

References
sports-reference

1962 births
Living people
Ecuadorian decathletes
Olympic athletes of Ecuador
Athletes (track and field) at the 1984 Summer Olympics
Athletes (track and field) at the 1988 Summer Olympics
Athletes (track and field) at the 1983 Pan American Games
Athletes (track and field) at the 1987 Pan American Games
South American Games silver medalists for Ecuador
South American Games bronze medalists for Ecuador
South American Games medalists in athletics
Competitors at the 1986 South American Games
Pan American Games competitors for Ecuador